Jaromír Turnovský (born 30 August 1912, date of death unknown) was a Czech speed skater. He competed in three events at the 1936 Winter Olympics.

References

External links

1912 births
Year of death missing
Czech male speed skaters
Olympic speed skaters of Czechoslovakia
Speed skaters at the 1936 Winter Olympics
Place of birth missing